The 2008 St. George Illawarra Dragons season was the 10th in the joint venture club's history. They competed in the NRL's 2008 Telstra Premiership and finished the regular season 7th out of 16 teams, being knocked out in the finals by eventual premiers, the Manly-Warringah Sea Eagles.

NRL Telstra Premiership
Having failed to bring the club a premiership during his current tenure with the Dragons and coming off contract at the end of the year, Coach Nathan Brown has had heat on him from 2007 to bring the Dragons up and away from the bottom of the ladder. Since the start of the 2008 season, the Dragons have had, once again, loss after loss which has caused Peter Doust (Dragons CEO), to bring in a new coach in the case of Brisbane Broncos current coach Wayne Bennett for the 2009 season up until 2011. The Dragons started the 2008 season by winning the Mercury Challenge match against the Bulldogs 40–30 at WIN Stadium in Wollongong and winning their first Toyota Cup trial match against Bulldogs at 30–22. The following week the Dragons went down to the South Sydney Rabbitohs in the annual Charity Shield clash 24–20 at ANZ Stadium.

The club received a boost in May when former Union and League (Brisbane Broncos) star Wendell Sailor joined the team after a 2-year ban from professional sport in Australia due to his cocaine controversy. The Dragons started another year with disappointing results when they only won three times after 10 rounds, defeating the Gold Coast Titans in Round 2, the Sydney Roosters in Round 7 and the Melbourne Storm in Round 10 all with terrific results. On 23 May, the Dragons recorded their first back-to-back wins of the season when they defeated the Manly-Warringah Sea Eagles at Brookvale Oval with a final score of 20–18.

The Dragons new winger Wendell Sailor made his NRL return in this match also sustaining a minor cheekbone injury. The club also signed South Sydney Rabbitohs player Ben Rogers from an immediate release to join the Dragons on 12 June but released Jason Ryles from his contract to join the Catalans Dragons in the Super League for 2009. Days later they signed New Zealand international and Melbourne Storm player Jeremy Smith for three seasons.

Their 7-game winning streak came to an end in Round 18 when they were defeated by the Canberra Raiders 19–12 at WIN Stadium for the Illawarra Heritage Match. On 15 July, it was announced that captain Mark Gasnier would not be returning after the end of the 2008 season to join the Stade Français Rugby Union team in France. The deal is worth around $1 million a year.

After 1 win in their last 5 games, the Dragons defeated the Brisbane Broncos at Suncorp Stadium with a 24–20 win. Then in Round 24, they defeated the New Zealand Warriors 34–6 at WIN Stadium, Wollongong to keep their finals hopes alive. The dragons were favoured to defeat the Roosters in round 26 to either finish fourth or fifth. They had been playing widespread open football and Mark Gasnier and Matt Cooper were carving up the opposition. In extremely wet conditions, the Roosters pack were more favoured to the conditions. They finished the regular season 7th place on the ladder which could have been 6th if they scored at least 2 points in their Round 26 match with the Sydney Roosters. They made it to the first week of the finals, but lost to the Manly-Warringah Sea Eagles 34–6 at Brookvale Oval being eliminated from the Finals series due to their lowly position in the Top 8.

The club went on a 'signing spree' purchasing Neville Costigan, Darius Boyd and Luke Priddis among others, but lost flyer Josh Morris (Bulldogs), Mark Gasnier (French Rugby), Jason Ryles (French league), Rangi Chase (ESL), Lagi Setu (Broncos) and Simon Woolford & Kirk Reynoldson with retirement.

2008 Match results 
*From Round 5 onwards, all games are in AEST.

Ladder

Gains and Losses
Gains

Losses

First Grade Signed Players
St George Illawarra Dragons has 31 signed players in first grade that play in the main competition.

Team Lineup
Line up for the Qualifying Finals vs. Manly-Warringah Sea Eagles:
Saturday, 13 September 2008 at 8:30pm AEST at Brookvale Oval, Sydney.

 

Last 9 are currently inactive due to injury, fulfilling other commitments, being used as "spares" or playing in lower grades. e.g. NSW Cup, Queensland Cup or Toyota Cup.

National Youth Competition (Toyota Cup Under 20s)
The Dragons U20s side were strong off from the start. For the Toyota Cup inaugural season, the Dragons Under-20s Side is coached by Steven Price. Before the regular season began, the Dragons won a Toyota Cup Trial match against the Bulldogs down at WIN Stadium in Wollongong. They started the regular season disappointing with a 34–22 loss to the Wests Tigers. However, the Dragons have not lost another match after that with 1 bye in their past leaving them on top of the Toyota Cup table, on 22 competition points. Their 10-match winning streak came to an end in Round 13 at WIN Stadium when they drew 22 all with the Brisbane Broncos. While the first Grade side continued their winning streak, the Under 20s were looking to start a losing streak as they were defeated back-to-back for the first time this year by the Penrith Panthers 28–26 in Round 15 at ANZ Stadium and 32-16 by the Gold Coast Titans at Skilled Park on the Gold Coast. They returned to the winners circle in Round 17 defeating the Newcastle Knights 26–18 at EnergyAustralia Stadium. In Round 18, straight after a fresh win, they once again lost a match this time against the Canberra Raiders 38–28 at WIN Stadium. They then had back and forth wins during the regular season keeping them in the top 8, struggling to keep their spot(s).

Toyota Cup signed players
The following 34 players are signed with the St. George Illawarra Dragons for the Toyota Cup.

Toyota Cup lineup
This is the Dragons' Toyota Cup weekly lineup.
Lineup for the Preliminary Finals vs. Canberra Raiders:
Friday, 26 September 2008 at 5:30 pm AEST at the Sydney Football Stadium, Sydney.

 

1 Interchange player to be omitted before game.
Last 6 are currently inactive due to injury, fulfilling other commitments, being used as "spares" or playing in the NSW Cup or the S.G. Ball Cup.

Ladder

References

St. George Illawarra Dragons seasons
St. George Illawarra Dragons season